The Everards Leicestershire and Rutland Cricket League (Leicestershire Cricket League until 2014) is the top level of competition for the amateur, recreational game of club cricket in Leicestershire and Rutland, England, and since 2002 has been a designated an ECB Premier League. The League headquarters is based in the Harborough District village of Thorpe Langton, Leicestershire.

In 2018 Uppingham Town became the first team from Rutland to take part in the Premier Division, with Oakham arriving in 2020. However, the 2020 competition was cancelled because of the COVID-19 pandemic. A replacement competition was organised for the later part of the season when cricket again became possible, but with the winners not to be regarded as official league champions.

Winners

Performance by season from 2002

References

External links
 Official L&RCL website
 Leicestershire Premier Cricket League play-cricket website

English domestic cricket competitions
Cricket in Leicestershire
Cricket in Rutland
ECB Premier Leagues
Club cricket